The vomer is one of the unpaired facial bones of the skull. It is located in the midsagittal line, and articulates with the sphenoid, the ethmoid, the left and right palatine bones, and the left and right maxillary bones. The vomer forms the inferior part of the nasal septum in humans, with the superior part formed by the perpendicular plate of the ethmoid bone. The name is derived from the Latin word for a ploughshare and the shape of the bone.

In humans 
The vomer is situated in the median plane, but its anterior portion is frequently bent to one side.

It is thin, somewhat quadrilateral in shape, and forms the hinder and lower part of the nasal septum; it has two surfaces and four borders.

The surfaces are marked by small furrows for blood vessels, and on each is the nasopalatine groove, which runs obliquely downward and forward, and lodges the nasopalatine nerve and vessels.

Borders 
The superior border, the thickest, presents a deep furrow, bounded on either side by a horizontal projecting expansion of bone – called the wing of vomer; the furrow receives the rostrum of the sphenoid, while the margins of the alae articulate with the vaginal processes of the medial pterygoid plates of the sphenoid behind, and with the sphenoidal processes of the palatine bones in front.

The inferior border articulates with the crest formed by the maxillæ and palatine bones.

The anterior border is the longest and slopes downward and forward. Its upper half is fused with the perpendicular plate of the ethmoid; its lower half is grooved for the inferior margin of the septal cartilage of the nose.

The posterior border is free of bony articulation, having no muscle attachments. It is concave, separates the choanae, and is thick and bifid above, thin below.

Articulations 
The human vomer articulates with six bones:
 two of the cranium, the sphenoid and ethmoid.
 four of the face, two maxillae; and two palatine bones.

It also articulates with the septal cartilage of the nose.

Vomeronasal organ 
The vomeronasal organ, also called Jacobson's organ, is a chemoreceptor organ named for its closeness to the vomer and nasal bones, and is particularly developed in animals such as cats (who adopt a characteristic pose called the Flehmen reaction or flehming when making use of it), and is thought to have to do with the perception of certain pheromones.

In other animals 
In bony fish, the vomers are flattened, paired, bones forming the anterior part of the roof of the mouth, just behind the premaxillary bones. In many species, they have teeth, supplementing those in the jaw proper; in some labyrinthodonts (extinct amphibians) the teeth on the vomers were actually larger than the primary set. In amphibians and reptiles, the vomers become narrower, due to the presence of the enlarged choanae (the inner part of the nostrils) on either side, and they may extend further back in the jaw. They are typically small in birds, where they form the upper hind part of the beak, again being located between the choanae.

In some living salamanders, including the mudpuppy, the maxilla is absent and therefore the vomerine teeth fulfill a major functional role in the upper jaw.

In mammals, the vomers have become narrower still, and are fused into a single, vertically oriented bone. The development of the hard palate beneath the vomer means that the bone is now located in a nasal chamber, separate from the mouth.

Additional images

See also

References

External links 

  – "Nasal Cavity: Bones"
  – "Diagram of skeleton of medial (septal) nasal wall."
 
  – "Nasal septum, lateral view"
 
 

Bones of the head and neck
Irregular bones
Facial bones
Flat bones